Warner Peak is an  summit, the highest point of the Hart Mountain massif in Lake County, Oregon, United States.

See also
List of mountain peaks of Oregon

References

Mountains of Lake County, Oregon
North American 2000 m summits